Elections to Strabane District Council were held on 19 May 1993 on the same day as the other Northern Irish local government elections. The election used three district electoral areas to elect a total of 16 councillors.

Election results

Note: "Votes" are the first preference votes.

Districts summary

|- class="unsortable" align="centre"
!rowspan=2 align="left"|Ward
! % 
!Cllrs
! % 
!Cllrs
! %
!Cllrs
! %
!Cllrs
! % 
!Cllrs
!rowspan=2|TotalCllrs
|- class="unsortable" align="center"
!colspan=2 bgcolor="" | SDLP
!colspan=2 bgcolor="" | UUP
!colspan=2 bgcolor="" | DUP
!colspan=2 bgcolor="" | Sinn Féin
!colspan=2 bgcolor="white"| Others
|-
|align="left"|Derg
|20.0
|1
|19.0
|1
|bgcolor="#D46A4C"|26.2
|bgcolor="#D46A4C"|1
|24.3
|1
|10.5
|1
|5
|-
|align="left"|Glenelly
|22.9
|1
|24.9
|2
|bgcolor="#D46A4C"|35.7
|bgcolor="#D46A4C"|2
|8.8
|0
|7.7
|0
|5
|-
|align="left"|Mourne
|bgcolor="#99FF66"|38.3
|bgcolor="#99FF66"|3
|16.3
|1
|0.0
|0
|29.0
|1
|16.4
|1
|6
|-
|- class="unsortable" class="sortbottom" style="background:#C9C9C9"
|align="left"| Total
|27.3
|5
|19.9
|4
|19.9
|3
|21.1
|3
|11.8
|1
|16
|-
|}

District results

Derg

1989: 1 x DUP, 1 x Sinn Féin, 1 x SDLP, 1 x UUP, 1 x Independent Unionist
1993: 1 x DUP, 1 x Sinn Féin, 1 x SDLP, 1 x UUP, 1 x Independent Unionist
1989-1993 Change: No change

Glenelly

1989: 2 x DUP, 1 x UUP, 1 x SDLP, 1 x Alliance
1993: 2 x DUP, 2 x UUP, 1 x SDLP
1989-1993 Change: UUP gain from Alliance

Mourne

1989: 2 x Independent Nationalist, 1 x SDLP, 1 x Sinn Féin, 1 x UUP
1993: 3 x SDLP, 1 x Sinn Féin, 1 x UUP, 1 x Independent Nationalist
1989-1993 Change: SDLP (two seats) gain from Independent Nationalist and due to the addition of one seat

References

Strabane District Council elections
Strabane